Prince Heinrich of Bavaria (28 March 1922 – 14 February 1958) was a member of the Bavarian royal House of Wittelsbach.

Prince Heinrich was born at Schloss Hohenburg in Bavaria and was the eldest child and only son (followed by daughters) from the marriage of Crown Prince Rupprecht of Bavaria and his second wife, Princess Antonia of Luxembourg.

On 31 July 1951, Prince Heinrich married Anne Marie de Lustrac (27 September 1927 in Neuilly-sur-Seine – 16 August 1999 in Milan), daughter of Baron Jean de Lustrac, French Army officer and decorated World War I veteran, and his American wife, Helen Reid, daughter of Fergus Reid of Norfolk, Virginia. The ceremony took place in Saint-Jean-de-Luz on the Basque coast in France. The couple did not have any children together.

The prince was a Knight of the Order of Saint Hubert. He died in a car accident in San Carlos de Bariloche, Argentina, in the Andes, on 14 February 1958. He is buried at the Andechs Abbey church in Bavaria. Prince Heinrich's widow, Anne Marie de Lustrac, died also in a car crash in Milan, Italy, on 16 August 1999.

Ancestry

References

Sources

 Die Wittelsbacher. Geschichte unserer Familie. Adalbert, Prinz von Bayern. Prestel Verlag, München, 1979
 The Book of Kings: A Royal Genealogy. C. Arnold McNaughton, in 3 volumes. London, U.K. Garnstone Press, 1973, volume 1

Princes of Bavaria
House of Wittelsbach
1922 births
1958 deaths
German Roman Catholics
Road incident deaths in Argentina
Burials at Andechs Abbey